American Dream (Shannon Carter) is a superhero appearing in American comic books published by Marvel Comics. Created by writer Tom DeFalco and artist Brent Anderson, the character first appeared in the MC2 series A-Nex #1 (August 1998). Initially debuting as a civilian in A-Next #1, the character is referred to as "Shannon" in A-Next #3, before appearing in costume as a prospective team member during A-Next #4. Her costume is very similar to that of the comic book superhero Captain America, and her initial weapons are throwing disks like Ricochet's but later obtains the trademark shield.

Publication history 
American Dream made her debut in A-Nex #1 (August 1998). She has starred in her own comic book series titled American Dream in May 2008. Later, American Dream appeared in Captain America Corps (June 2011).

Fictional character biography

The niece of S.H.I.E.L.D. agent Sharon Carter, Shannon Carter grew up idolizing Captain America. She is hired by Edwin Jarvis as a tour guide for the Avengers Headquarters, at the time functioning only as a museum. When the new Avengers team is formed, she is determined to join. She wears a costume based on Captain America's and carries on her arms disc weapons resembling miniature versions of his shield. Her strength and agility are honed by intensive physical training. After joining the team as the American Dream, Shannon soon proves herself to be an effective Avenger, and when the team saves the original Avengers from a dark parallel world, Captain America himself judges her worthy to wield the shield of the alternate Captain. She also proves to be an important character in defeating Galactus in the Last Planet Standing limited series. She, along with Stinger and Spider-Girl, take down Galactus from the inside. They survive the imminent explosion by shrinking to microscopic size.

Carter is the leader of the "Dream Team", consisting of herself, Bluestreak, Crimson Curse and Freebooter. All members of the Dream Team become members of the new Avengers team in A-Next #4. American Dream is also an ally of Spider-Girl, Earth Sentry, Blacklight, Coal Tiger, Argo and Captain America.

American Dream has fought against the Sons of the Serpent, Seth, the Revengers, Fatal Force and Loki. When Superia launches a cross-temporal attack to eliminate Steve Rogers' post-war career as Captain America and take his place herself, American Dream is one of five heirs to Rogers' legacy that were assembled by the Contemplator to thwart her plans, the others being Rogers early in his career, John Walker shortly after his own time as Cap, Bucky during his time as Captain America, and Commander A from the twenty-fifth century. She receives an invitation to join the newly established Avengers squad. She has designed a suit, made disc weapons that resembled miniaturized copies of Captain America's shield, and engaged in extensive physical training to become the strongest and most agile person on the planet.

Powers and abilities
Although a non-powered human, American Dream is in peak physical condition and is a skilled martial artist and an Olympic level athlete. She has disc weapons similar to Ricochet's and has a superb aim. She now also carries a version of Captain America's shield, which she uses both defensively and offensively to great effect. Her fighting skills are matched by her leadership ability.

Reception

Critical reception 
Mat Elfring of GameSpot included American Dream in their "20 Most Patriotic Comic Book Characters" list. CBR.com ranked American Dream 10th in their "10 Most Muscular Women In Marvel Comics" list, 13th in their "8 Captain Americas Better Than Steve Rogers (And 7 Who Couldn't Handle It)" list, and 17th in their "Shield Of Dreams: The Very Best Captain Americas" list.

Literary reception

Volumes

American Dream - 2008 
According to Diamond Comic Distributors, American Dream #1 sold out in May 2008. American Dream #1 was the 131st best selling comic book in May 2008. American Dream #2 was the 147th best selling comic book in May 2008.

Other versions

Secret Wars 
During the 2017 Secret Wars storyline, Ellie Rogers is the daughter of Steve Rogers and Sharon Carter in the Battleworld domain of the Hydra Empire. She is part of the Resistance when a group of female assassins and infected by Venom. Ellie escapes while most of the Resistance was killed and eventually turned into the symbiote-powered Viper, but uses these abilities to help Nomad.

In other media

Video games 
 American Dream appears as a playable character in Marvel Super Hero Squad Online, voiced by Tara Strong.
 American Dream appears as a female enhanced costume for Steve Rogers / Captain America in Marvel Heroes, voiced by Melissa Disney.
 A variation of Shannon Rogers named Sharon Rogers appears as a playable character in Marvel: Future Fight. As part of Captain America's 75th anniversary, she is the daughter of Steve Rogers and Peggy Carter from an alternate timeline where she now serves as Captain America.

Collected editions

References

External links
 
 Shannon Carter on the Marvel Database

Reviews
 American Dream #2 review at Major Spoilers
 American Dream #1 review at Major Spoilers
 Review of American Dream #1, Comics Bulletin

2008 comics debuts
Fictional characters from parallel universes
Marvel Comics limited series
Marvel Comics martial artists
Marvel Comics 2
Characters created by Tom DeFalco
Comics characters introduced in 1998
Fictional blade and dart throwers
Fictional shield fighters
Fictional women soldiers and warriors
United States-themed superheroes
Marvel Comics female superheroes
Fictional tour guides